Trapania nebula is a species of sea slug, a dorid nudibranch, a marine gastropod mollusc in the family Goniodorididae.

Distribution
This species was described from Madang, Papua New Guinea.

Description
This goniodorid nudibranch is translucent grey-brown with an irregular pattern of white covering most of the body. The rhinophores and gills are edged with yellow or orange.

Ecology
Trapania nebula probably feeds on Entoprocta which often grow on sponges and other living substrata.

References

Goniodorididae
Gastropods described in 2008